The year 2013 is the 21st year in the history of the Ultimate Fighting Championship (UFC), a mixed martial arts promotion based in the United States. 2013 started with UFC on FX: Belfort vs. Bisping. 2013 also saw the introduction of the women's bantamweight weight class with UFC 157: Rousey vs. Carmouche.

Title fights

The Ultimate Fighter

Debut UFC fighters

The following fighters fought their first UFC fight in 2013:

Adam Cella
Adlan Amagov
Adriano Martins
Alan Patrick
Alex Garcia
Alexis Davis
Ali Bagautinov
Alptekin Özkiliç
Amanda Nunes
Andre Fili
Anthony Lapsley
Anthony Smith
Antonio Braga Neto
Ben Wall
Bethe Correia
Bobby Green
Bobby Voelker
Brandon Thatch
Brian Houston
Brian Melancon
Bristol Marunde
Bruno Santos
Bubba McDaniel
Caros Fodor
Cat Zingano
Chris Holdsworth
Clint Hester
Collin Hart
Conor McGregor
Daniel Cormier
Daniel Omielańczuk
Daniel Sarafian
Darrell Montague
Davey Grant
Drew Dober
Dustin Kimura
Dustin Ortiz
Dylan Andrews
Eddie Mendez
Elias Silvério
Estevan Payan
Francimar Barroso
Garett Whiteley
Gegard Mousasi
Germaine de Randamie
Gian Villante
Gilbert Melendez
Gilbert Smith

Godofredo Pepey
Hyun Gyu Lim
Igor Araújo
Ildemar Alcântara
Iliarde Santos
Ilir Latifi
Isaac Vallie-Flagg
Ivan Jorge
James Krause
James Vick
Jared Rosholt
Jessamyn Duke
Jesse Ronson
Jéssica Andrade
Jessica Eye
Jessica Rakoczy
Jimmy Quinlan
João Zeferino
Jon Manley
Jordan Mein
Jorge Masvidal
Jose Maria Tome
Josh Samman
Josh Sampo
Julianna Peña
Julie Kedzie
Junior Hernandez
Justin Scoggins
K. J. Noons
Kazuki Tokudome
Kelvin Gastelum
Kevin Casey
Kevin Souza
K. J. Noons
Krzysztof Jotko
Kurt Holobaugh
Kyoji Horiguchi
Kyung Ho Kang
Leandro Silva
Leonardo Santos
Liz Carmouche
Lorenz Larkin
Lucas Martins
Luke Barnatt
Luke Rockhold
Michel Prazeres
Miesha Tate
Mizuto Hirota
Nah-Shon Burrell

Nandor Guelmino
Neil Magny
Nico Musoke
Nikita Krylov
Omari Akhmedov
Ovince St. Preux
Pedro Nobre
Peggy Morgan
Piotr Hallmann
Quinn Mulhern
Rafael Cavalcante
Raquel Pennington
Richie Vaculik
Robert Whiteford
Roger Bowling
Roger Gracie
Roger Hollett
Ronaldo Souza
Ronda Rousey
Rosi Sexton
Roxanne Modafferi
Ryan Benoit
Ryan Couture
Ryan LaFlare
Santiago Ponzinibbio
Sara McMann
Sarah Kaufman
Sean Spencer
Sergio Pettis
Sheila Gaff
Thiago Santos
Tim Kennedy
Tom Niinimäki
Tor Troéng
Trevor Smith
Tyron Woodley
Uriah Hall
Viscardi Andrade
Walt Harris
William Macário
Wilson Reis
Yan Cabral
Yancy Medeiros
Yoel Romero
Yuri Villefort
Zach Makovsky
Zak Cummings

Events list

UFC on FX: Belfort vs. Bisping

UFC on FX: Belfort vs. Bisping (also known as UFC on FX 7) was a mixed martial arts event held by the Ultimate Fighting Championship on January 19, 2013, at Ginásio do Ibirapuera in São Paulo, Brazil.

Background
The main fight featured middleweights Michael Bisping and Vitor Belfort. The event also held the first UFC fight for Daniel Sarafian, middleweight finalist on the first season of The Ultimate Fighter: Brazil. Sarafian was injured before the championship fight with Cezar Ferreira, who went on to win the show.

Johnny Eduardo was briefly linked to a bout at this event against Iuri Alcântara, but was replaced by George Roop. Roop was then injured and replaced by UFC newcomer Pedro Nobre.

Thiago Perpetuo was expected to face Michael Kuiper at the event; however, Perpetuo suffered an injury and was replaced by Caio Magalhaes. On December 27, it was announced that Magalhaes had also pulled out of the bout and that Kuiper would be shifted to UFC on Fox 6 on January 26, 2013 to face Buddy Roberts.

Roger Hollett was expected to face Wagner Prado at the event; however, Hollett was forced out of the bout with a torn bicep and was replaced by promotional newcomer Ildemar Alcântara.

Results

Bonus awards
Fighters were awarded $50,000 bonuses.

 Fight of the Night: C.B. Dollaway vs. Daniel Sarafian
 Knockout of the Night: Vitor Belfort
 Submission of the Night: Ildemar Alcântara

UFC on Fox: Henderson vs. Melendez

UFC on Fox: Henderson vs. Melendez (also known as UFC on Fox 7) was a mixed martial arts event held on April 20, 2013, at the HP Pavilion in San Jose, California.  The event was broadcast live on FOX.

Background
The event was headlined by a UFC Lightweight Championship bout between defending champion Benson Henderson and Strikeforce Lightweight Champion Gilbert Melendez.  Also featured on the card was a bout between two time UFC Heavyweight Champion Frank Mir and Strikeforce Heavyweight Grand Prix Champion Daniel Cormier.

Clay Guida was expected to face Chad Mendes at this event.  However it was revealed on March 15 that Guida had pulled out of the bout citing an injury and was replaced by Darren Elkins.

Dan Hardy was expected to face Matt Brown at the event.  However, Hardy was forced out of the bout due to medical issues regarding his heart and was replaced by Jordan Mein.

Francisco Rivera was expected to face Hugo Viana at the event.  However, Rivera was forced out of the bout with an injury and replaced by T.J. Dillashaw.

A scheduled bout between Jon Tuck and Norman Parke was scrapped during the week leading up to the event, as Tuck was forced out of the bout with an injury.

Results

Bonus Awards
Fighters were awarded $50,000 bonuses.

 Fight of the Night: Matt Brown vs. Jordan Mein
 Knockout of the Night: Josh Thomson and Yoel Romero
 Submission of the Night: None

Reported payout
The following is the reported payout to the fighters as reported to the California State Athletic Commission. It does not include sponsor money and also does not include the UFC's traditional "fight night" bonuses or Pay-Per-View quotas.
 Benson Henderson: $200,000 (includes $100,000 win bonus) def. Gilbert Melendez: $175,000
 Daniel Cormier: $126,000 (includes $63,000 win bonus) def. Frank Mir: $200,000
 Josh Thomson: $95,000 (includes $10,000 win bonus) def. Nate Diaz: $15,000
 Matt Brown: $60,000 (includes $30,000 win bonus) def. Jordan Mein: $16,000
 Chad Mendes: $56,000 (includes $28,000 win bonus) def. Darren Elkins: $24,000
 Francis Carmont: $38,000 (includes $19,000 win bonus) def. Lorenz Larkin: $23,000
 Myles Jury: $16,000 (includes $8,000 win bonus) def. Ramsey Nijem: $14,000
 Joseph Benavidez: $66,000 (includes $33,000 win bonus) def. Darren Uyenoyama: $12,000
 Jorge Masvidal: $60,000 (includes $30,000 win bonus) def. Tim Means: $10,000
 T.J. Dillashaw: $28,000 (includes $14,000 win bonus) def. Hugo Viana: $8,000
 Anthony Njokuani: $36,000 (includes $18,000 win bonus) def. Roger Bowling: $12,000
 Yoel Romero: $20,000 (includes $10,000 win bonus) def. Clifford Starks: $8,000

See also
 UFC
 List of UFC champions
 List of UFC events

References

External links
 UFC past events on UFC.com
 UFC events results at Sherdog.com

Ultimate Fighting Championship by year
2013 in mixed martial arts